The 1993 Cleveland Browns season was the team's 44th season with the National Football League. This season was notable for coach Bill Belichick deciding to bench, and then ultimately release, longtime starting quarterback Bernie Kosar in favor of Vinny Testaverde. Kosar resurfaced during the season with the Dallas Cowboys, when he was part of the eventual Super Bowl champions as a fill-in for injured quarterback Troy Aikman. The Browns get off to a 5–2 start despite the quarterback controversy. Prior to the start of the season the Browns signed free agent quarterback Vinny Testaverde. Originally Testaverde was supposed to back-up his former University of Miami teammate Kosar. However, when Testaverde performed better when given the opportunity to play some felt there should be a change at the quarterback position. However, the Browns went beyond that by unceremoniously releasing Kosar in the middle of the season. The Browns lost their next four games and seven of their last nine to finish with a 7–9 record.

NFL Draft
 Traded 1x11 to Denver Broncos for 1x14 and 3x83
 1x14: OG/C Steve Everitt
 2x42: DE Dan Footman
 Traded 3rd Rounder to Detroit Lions for DT Jerry Ball
 3x83: LB Mike Caldwell
 Traded 4th Rounder to Chicago Bears for C Jay Hilgenberg
 5x124: OT Herman Arvie
 6x153: LB Rich McKenzie
 7x180: LB Travis Hill
 Traded 8th Rounder to Los Angeles Rams for LB Frank Stams

Personnel

Staff

Roster

Schedule

Note: Intra-division opponents are in bold text.

Season summary

Week 3 at Raiders

Week 7

Week 13: at Atlanta

Standings

References

External links 
 1993 Cleveland Browns at Pro Football Reference (Profootballreference.com)
 1993 Cleveland Browns Statistics at jt-sw.com
 1993 Cleveland Browns Schedule at jt-sw.com
 1993 Cleveland Browns at DatabaseFootball.com  

Cleveland
Cleveland Browns seasons
Cleveland